Charles Chew, Jr. (October 9, 1922 – July 3, 1986) was an American politician.

Born in Greenville, Mississippi, Chew served in the United States Navy during World War II. He went to Tuskegee University and Harvard University. Chew served on the Chicago City Council and was a Democrat. He worked as an administrative assistant in community relations in the Cook County Sheriff office. Chew served in the Illinois Senate from 1967 until his death in 1986. Chew died in a hospital in Chicago, Illinois from throat cancer.

Notes

1922 births
1986 deaths
Politicians from Chicago
Politicians from Greenville, Mississippi
Military personnel from Illinois
Harvard University alumni
Tuskegee University alumni
Chicago City Council members
Democratic Party Illinois state senators
Deaths from cancer in Illinois
20th-century American politicians
United States Navy personnel of World War II
Deaths from throat cancer